Pradip Bhattarai (also spelled Pradeep) is a Nepalese screenwriter and film director. He made his directorial debut in 2016 with the film Jatra. It was a heist-comedy film which was produced by Singe Lama and Yadav Poudel under the banner of Shatkon Arts. The film was commercially successful. Since then he directed two other films, Shatru Gate in 2018, and Jatrai Jatra in 2019, both of which were commercially successful. Bhattarai is also one of the judges of the first Nepali comedy-reality TV show Comedy Champion.

Early life
Bhattarai was born on 6th Aug 1983 in Sarlahi.

Filmography

Awards

References

External links

Living people
Nepalese film directors
1983 births
People from Janakpur
21st-century Nepalese screenwriters
21st-century Nepalese film directors